Igor Popov (born 25 March 1970) is a Ukrainian retired volleyball player. He was a member of Ukraine men's national volleyball team. At club level, he played in Italy (for Ignis Padova, Com Cavi Napoli and Kappa Torino) and in Greece for Olympiacos and Orestiada.

Popov trained a women's volleyball team called "Favorit" (Kyiv, UA).

References

External links
 Igor Popov at CEV official website
 Igor Popov at Greekvolley.com

1970 births
Living people
Ukrainian men's volleyball players
Olympiacos S.C. players
Sportspeople from Luhansk
20th-century Ukrainian people